The ČD Class 840 and 841 diesel multiple units are two versions of the Stadler Regio-Shuttle RS1 built for České dráhy. 841 is the basic version, 840 is a modification for services on steep mountain lines. Since 2013, České dráhy have been using a marketing name for those trainsets, RegioSpider.

Class 841 

ČD Class 841 is used in Vysočina Region. České dráhy have ordered 17 trains; the total amount paid for them was 898 million Kč, of which 200 million Kč was covered by the European Union, the investment of České dráhy themselves was 678.8 million Kč.

Class 840 

ČD Class 840 is used on services in Liberec Region. There are 16 trains in service. The maximum speed is 120 km/h, while it was meant to be just 100 km/h at the time of order, the unit is modified for service on steep lines and lines using rack rails. The rack rail compatibility was required to be able to serve the Tanvald to Harrachov line, but the trains themselves lack the rack railway equipment.

Gallery

References

External links 
 Regio-Shuttle RS1 at the manufacturer's website
 Stadler Regio-Shuttle RS1 at the website of České dráhy

Diesel multiple units of the Czech Republic